The men's qualification rounds at the 2014 World Artistic Gymnastics Championships took place on October 3–4, 2014 in the Guangxi Gymnasium in Nanning.

Team Qualification

Individual all-around Qualifications
Although Nile Wilson of Great Britain qualified ahead of teammate Max Whitlock, Wilson withdrew from the all-around final due to an wrist injury. Whitlock took his place in the all-around competition.

Floor Exercise

Pommel Horse

Still Rings

Vault

Parallel Bars

Horizontal Bar

References

2014 World Artistic Gymnastics Championships